Sachin Siwach is an Indian boxer from Bhiwani. He became the third Indian to win gold at the World Youth Championship.

Career 
Born on 6 December 1999 in Mitathal village near Bhiwani, Haryana. Sachin took boxing at the age of 10. His father, Mr. Kishan Kumar who is a farmer by profession, and mother, Mrs. Nirmala Devi, always encouraged him to work to pursue a career in boxing.

Sachin secured a place at Captain Hawa Singh Academy in Bhiwani, where he trained under the supervision of coach Sanjay Kumar. His coach initially refused to enroll him into the academy because he was undernourished.

He won a gold medal in Commonwealth Youth Games in Bahamas. He also won a gold medal in AIBA Youth World Boxing Championships in 2016. He became the third Indian to win gold at the World Youth Championship after Nanao Singh in 2008 and Vikas Krishan in 2010.

He won bronze medal in  AIBA Junior Boxing World Championship in Saint Petersburg , Russia in September 2015.

In 2017, he won a silver medal in the 49 kg category at Asian Youth Boxing Championship held in Bangkok. In 2018, at 19 years old, he competed in World Series of Boxing and defeated Russian debutanat Dorzho Radnaev in the light flyweight (49 kg) category.

He was named Asian Boxing Confederation's best youth boxer of the year.

In 2019, he competed in the 52 kg category and was among the 6 semi-finalists in the 38th GeeBee Boxing Tournament in Helsinki, Finland.

Sachin Siwach won a gold medal in the 56 kg category at 2019 South Asian Games help in Kathmandu, Nepal.

Achievements 

 2019: India Open, Guwahati: Silver
 2019: GeeBee Boxing Tournament, Finland: Bronze
 2017: Commonwealth Youth Games in Nassau, Bahamas: Gold
 2017: Asian Youth Boxing Championship, Bangkok: silver
 2016: Youth Boxing World Championships, St Petersburg, Russia: Gold
 2015: AIBA Junior Boxing World Championships, St Petersburg, Russia: Bronze
 2014: Federation Cup Boxing tournament: Gold
 2011: Junior Nationals: Quarterfinals
 2010: Haryana State championships, Wins Gold

References

Living people
Indian male boxers
Boxers from Haryana
1999 births